The 2020 Lamar Cardinals football team represented Lamar University in the 2020–21 NCAA Division I FCS football season as a member of the Southland Conference. The Cardinals were led by first-year head coach Blane Morgan and played their home games at Provost Umphrey Stadium.  Originally scheduled to play an eleven-game regular season schedule in 2020, the Cardinals played shortened 6 game schedule in Spring 2021 with all games against conference members due to the COVID19 Pandemic.  The Cardinals finished the season with a 2–4 overall record.  The conference record was also 2–4 tied for fifth place with McNeese.

Previous season
The Cardinals finished the season with a 4–8 overall record.  They were 2–7 in Southland play finishing in eleventh place. After receiving a contract extension through the 2021 season at the conclusion of the 2018 season, head coach Mike Schultz was relieved of his duties after the 2019 season completed.

Preseason

Recruiting
Sources:

Spring practice and Spring game
Lamar Football announced on February 21 over its Twitter account that Spring practice will start on March 25.  Fourteen sessions have been scheduled.  The Spring game, scheduled for April 25, will conclude the sessions.  The Spring game was canceled on March 19, 2020 as a result of the COVID-19 pandemic.

Preseason poll
The Southland Conference released their spring preseason poll in January 2021. The Cardinals were picked to finish seventh in the conference. In addition, two Cardinals were chosen to the Preseason All-Southland Team

Preseason All–Southland Teams

Offense

1st Team
Bailey Giffen – Kicker, SR

Defense

1st Team
Michael Lawson – Defensive Back, SR
Michael Lawson – Punt Returner, SR

Coaching staff and roster

Schedule

Game summaries

at Nicholls

Incarnate Word

at McNeese State

Sam Houston State

Northwestern State

at Southeastern Louisiana

References

Lamar
Lamar Cardinals football seasons
Lamar Cardinals football